"Every Heartbeat" is a song by American Christian singer Amy Grant. It was released in June 1991 (in remixed and re-produced form) as the third single from her ninth studio album, Heart in Motion (1991), though it was the second from the album to be released to mainstream pop radio. It reached  2 on the US Billboard Hot 100 and on the Adult Contemporary chart for one and six weeks, respectively. Charlie Peacock wrote the song's music and chorus lyrics, with Grant and Wayne Kirkpatrick composing the remaining lyrics. 

In 1992, Kids Incorporated covered "Every Heartbeat" in the Season 8 episode "Old Friends". In 2004, Sixpence None the Richer covered "Every Heartbeat" on the album Full Circle: A Celebration of Songs and Friends, which commemorated Charlie Peacock's 20-year anniversary as a solo recording artist. Mark Lowry parodied the song with the title "Every Teacher". In 2014, the song was included on Grant's remix compilation album, In Motion: The Remixes. A digital remix EP was released on iTunes in support of the album which charted at No. 13 on the Billboard Hot Dance Club Songs chart.

Music video
A music video was produced to promote the single. The video was directed by D.J. Webster and edited by Scott C. Wilson. Actress Musetta Vander is featured in it.

Track listings
US 7-inch and cassette single
 "Every Heartbeat" (7-inch Heart and Soul mix) – 3:49
 "Every Heartbeat" (7-inch Body and Soul mix) – 3:50

Canada cassette single
 "Every Heartbeat" (7-inch Heart and Soul mix) – 3:49
 "Every Heartbeat" (7-inch Body and Soul mix) – 3:50

2014 US digital remix single
 "Every Heartbeat" (Moto Blanco radio edit) – 3:24
 "Every Heartbeat" (Moto Blanco club mix) – 5:30
 "Every Heartbeat" (Moto Blanco instrumental) – 5:30

Personnel
 Amy Grant – lead vocals, backing vocals
 Charlie Peacock – keyboards, programming, horn arrangements 
 Robbie Buchanan – additional keyboards
 Blair Masters – additional keyboards
 Jerry McPherson – guitars
 Tommy Sims – bass
 Chris McHugh – drums
 Mark Douthit – saxophone
 Barry Green – trombone
 Mike Haynes – trumpet
 Chris McDonald – horn arrangements
 Chris Eaton – backing vocals
 Kim Fleming – backing vocals
 Vicki Hampton – backing vocals
 Daniel Abraham – additional production and remix (Heart and Soul 7-inch and 12-inch mixes, Body and Soul 7-inch and 12-inch mixes, Piano 7-inch and 12-inch mixes)

Charts

Weekly charts

Year-end charts

Release history

References

1990 songs
1991 singles
A&M Records singles
Amy Grant songs
Song recordings produced by Brown Bannister
Songs written by Amy Grant
Songs written by Wayne Kirkpatrick